The ABBA Generation Remix is an A-Teens album, a compilation of the best remixes of their singles from their first album, The ABBA Generation.

Released in Japan only, including 12 re-mixed tracks and exclusive artwork. This album was released after the success of the first album in the Asian country.

Track listing

References

A-Teens albums
2001 remix albums